The first known pattern for the Newfoundland 20-cent piece is a bronze strike with an obverse derived from a New Brunswick coin. The reverse is from the die for the 1864 New Brunswick 20-cents. The twenty-cent denomination was very popular in Newfoundland and was minted on a consistent basis throughout the reign of Queen Victoria. Over the years the piece became unpopular with Canadians as it was easily confused with the Canadian 25-cent piece, which was similar in size and shape. Pressured by Canada, the government replaced it with a twenty-five cent coin during World War I.

Queen Victoria Laureated Portrait, 1865-1894

Specifications

Mintages

Mintages

1896 has Large 96 and Small 96 Varieties.
1899 has three varieties, large 99, small 99 and Hook 99's where the bottom of the 9's appear to have ends like those of fishing hooks.

Edward VII 1904

Twenty-cent coins were required only on one occasion during Edward's short reign, making the 1904 issue the only one during his reign.

Specifications

Mintages

George V 1912
Just like the Edwardian predecessor, the George V issue was only for one year.

Specifications

Mintages

References

External links 
 Canadian Maritime Provinces Bronze Coins 1861-1947

 0.20
Twenty-cent coins